The Fireside Festival is an annual event that takes place in Canberra, Australia centered around promoting more than 50 local wines with a different theme every year.  Entry fee is $12 (which includes a souvenir tasting glass) and the festival lasts for around a month with an offering of dinners, masterclasses and day trips throughout the Canberra region in August.

2019 Event 
Some of the 2019 events included: a trivia evening by the fire (Contentious Character), dinner and wine from the Lake George Winery tasting and matching dinner, food and wine tasting and an educational evening at Monster Kitchen & Bar on wine glasses. In 2020 the theme was: ‘Fuel your inner fire with our Liquid Geography.’ Some of the offerings included: a smoke tasting from Murrambateman Winery, performances from Canadian musicians and more.

References 

Events in Canberra